Kheyrabad (also Romanized as Kheyrābād and Khairābād) is a village in Qahfarrokh Rural District of Farrokhshahr District, Shahrekord County, Chaharmahal and Bakhtiari province, Iran. At the 2006 census, its population was 1,076 in 283 households. The following census in 2011 counted 1,122 people in 333 households. The latest census in 2016 showed a population of 979 people in 301 households. It was the only village in its rural district and is populated by Lurs.

References 

Shahrekord County

Populated places in Chaharmahal and Bakhtiari Province

Populated places in Shahr-e Kord County

Luri settlements in Chaharmahal and Bakhtiari Province